Alberta Provincial Highway No. 20, commonly referred to as Highway 20, is a highway in central Alberta, Canada, west of Highway 2.

Route description 

Highway 20 begins Highway 11 and travels north for  along the east side of the town of Sylvan Lake to a roundabout with Highway 11A. Highway 20 proceeds another  before reconnecting with Highway 20A, and travels another  to Highway 53 east, where it heads east towards Ponoka.

History 
From this intersection, Highway 12 continued north to Rimbey, Breton, and Alsike. In the mid-1980s, when Highway 11 was realigned to bypass Sylvan Lake, Highway 20 was extended  to the south to connect with the new alignment. In January 1988, the  section of Highway 12 between Bentley and Alsike was redesignated as Highway 20, while Highway 51 was decommissioned and redesignated as the new western section of Highway 12.

Major intersections 
From south to north:

Highway 20A 

Alberta Provincial Highway No. 20A is the designation of a  alternate route off Highway 20 serving the Town of Rimbey. It starts within Rimbey at Highway 53 and ends  to the north at Highway 20.

Major intersections

References 

020